The following is a list of television stations formerly owned and/or operated by Ion Media through its television stations division, Ion Media Television. As of September 2020, the company owned and operated 71 stations in 62 markets, all of which were primarily affiliated with either Ion Television or sister network Ion Plus. Ion Media would be acquired by the E. W. Scripps Company and its networks merged into Katz Broadcasting in a deal that closed on January 7, 2021, with Ion's stations either absorbed into Scripps' portfolio or sold to Inyo Broadcast Holdings. 

The following list does not include existing Scripps stations that have taken Ion Television as a subchannel affiliation.

For a list of all stations affiliated with Ion Television, see List of Ion Television affiliates.

 (**) – Indicates that it was built and signed on by either Ion Media, or its predecessor Paxson Communications.

Sources

 
ION owned and or operated